Calliostoma koma is a species of sea snail, a marine gastropod mollusk in the family Calliostomatidae.

Some authors place this taxon in the subgenus Calliostoma (Tristichotrochus)

Description
The size of the shell varies between 18 mm and 30 mm.

Distribution
This marine species occurs off Taiwan, Southern Japan; in the East China Sea and the Yellow Sea.

References

 Choe, B.L. & Yoon, S.H. (1990). Classification and description of Mesogastropods from Ullung Island Waters. Korean Journal of Malacology. (1) 6 : 45-55

External links
 

koma
Gastropods described in 1965